James Craven (born October 2, 1892 – June 29, 1955) was an American actor. He played a wide variety of roles and has a minimum of 98 film and television credits including the TV show The Adventures of Kit Carson, as well as the classic motion picture, Johnny Belinda, and the popular movie serials, The Green Archer, Captain Midnight and King of the Rocket Men. 

In his book, Serials-ly Speaking: Essays on Cliffhangers author William C. Cline described Craven's screen presence and characterisations in this fashion: "Suave, sophisticated and crafty, James Craven worked both sides of the street in cliffhangers. As a distinguished-looking man -- supposedly a gentleman -- he gained the confidence of the good guys while working against them at every turn... Starting with The Green Archer for Columbia Pictures in 1940, Craven schemed his way through seven serials including White Eagle (1941), Captain Midnight (1942) at Columbia, The Purple Monster Strikes (1945), Federal Agents vs. Underworld Inc. (1948), King of the Rocket Men (1949), and Flying Disc Man from Mars (1950) at Republic Pictures."

Partial filmography
The Green Archer (1940, serial)
Tumbledown Ranch in Arizona (1941)
Little Joe, the Wrangler (1941)
White Eagle (1941, serial)
A Yank in the R.A.F. (1941)
Captain Midnight (1942, serial)
Today I Hang (1942)
Immortal Sergeant (1943)
The Purple Monster Strikes (1945, serial)
Days of Buffalo Bill (1946)
Murder in the Music Hall (1946)
Sheriff of Redwood Valley (1946)
Desperadoes of Dodge City (1948)
Million Dollar Weekend (1948)
Johnny Belinda (1948)
Federal Agents vs. Underworld Inc. (1948, serial)
King of the Rocket Men (1949, serial)
Flying Disc Man from Mars (1950, serial)
Trial Without Jury (1950)
Wells Fargo Gunmaster (1951)
The Adventures of Kit Carson (1951, TV series)
Against All Flags (1952)
 Adventures of Superman (1953, TV series, 1 episode)
Blades of the Musketeers (1953)
East of Sumatra (1953)

Further reading

References

External links 

 

1892 births
1955 deaths
Male actors from Pennsylvania
20th-century American male actors